Manjoor is an Indian village located in northern Kottayam district of the state of Kerala, India. Manjoor is approximately 20 km north of the district capital Kottayam. It is situated on the Kottayam-Vaikom bus-route, and is close to the towns of Kuravilangad,
Ettumanoor and Kaduthuruthy.

Manjoor is the birthplace of Bishop Mar Mathew Makil, the first bishop of the Kottayam diocese (Knanaya) of the Syro-Malabar Catholic Church. Manjoor is the hometown of film director Dileesh Pothan, best known for his Malayalam films. Manjoor is the site of the Malliyoor Temple as well.

References

Villages in Kottayam district